Peter Kekeris (born 7 May 1999), is an Australian professional footballer who plays as a winger for Rockdale Ilinden in the National Premier Leagues NSW.

International career
Kekeris was born in Australia and is of Greek descent. Despite being one of the youngest players in his then National team, he played for Australia U-17s on 7 occasions.

References

External links

1999 births
Living people
Australian people of Greek descent
Australian soccer players
Australia youth international soccer players
Association football midfielders
Western Sydney Wanderers FC players
Central Coast Mariners FC players
National Premier Leagues players
A-League Men players